Joseph Ashe  was an Irish politician.

Ashe was born in 1707 at Ashfield, County Meath and educated at Trinity College, Dublin. He was MP for Trim in County Meath from  1735 to 1760.

References

People from County Meath
1707 births
Irish MPs 1727–1760
Alumni of Trinity College Dublin
Members of the Parliament of Ireland (pre-1801) for County Meath constituencies